Silva Jardim is a municipality located in the Brazilian state of Rio de Janeiro. Its population was 21,774 (2020) and its area is 938 km².

Conservation

The municipality  contains the  Poço das Antas Biological Reserve, a strictly protected conservation unit created in 1974 from a former experimental agricultural station.
It contains 7.5% of the  Três Picos State Park, created in 2002.
It contains part of the Central Rio de Janeiro Atlantic Forest Mosaic of conservation units, created in 2006.

See also
Antônio da Silva Jardim

References

Municipalities in Rio de Janeiro (state)